Weddings in Myanmar, considered auspicious occasions in Burmese culture, reflect various ethnic, religious, and regional traditions. Depending on an individual's family social  economic status, personal preferences and titles held, Burmese weddings can be religious or secular, and extravagant or simple.

Traditions by ethnicity

Bamar traditions 
The wedding traditions of the Bamar people (Burmans), who comprise the majority of Myanmar's population, incorporate a number of rituals and practices. Weddings are considered one of the Twelve Auspicious Rites among the Bamar. Wedding expenses are typically borne by the groom's family. Dowries are typically unheard of although arranged marriage is not a custom of the common Burmese. 

Traditional Burmese folklore considers love to be destiny, as the Hindu god Brahma writes one's destiny in love on a child's brow when he or she is six days old, called . 

Buddhist monks are not present to conduct the wedding and solemnise the marriage, as they are forbidden to officiate weddings, which are considered a worldly affair. However, they may be invited to bless the newly wed couple and recite a protective paritta. Typically, the bride and groom arrange an almsgiving feast called  to monks the morning of the wedding.

Traditionally, a marriage is recognised with or without a ceremony when the man's longyi (sarong) is seen hanging from a rail of the house or if the couple eats from the same plate. A more extravagant wedding requires months of preparation, including consultation with an astrologer in choosing the most auspicious date and time in accordance with the Burmese calendar. The traditional Burmese months of Tagu, Kason, Nayon, Thadingyut, Tazaungmon, and Tabodwe are considered auspicious for weddings. Weddings are traditionally avoided during the Buddhist lent, which lasts three months from July to October.

The groom's family formally asks the bride's family for their blessing by offering a receptacle of a green coconut with its stalk intact encircled by bunches of green bananas called . The wedding details are negotiated between the families. Some Bamar families invite a spirit medium to protect the couple under the care of the household nat (spirit).

Also, a master of ceremonies, typically a brahmin, consecrates the ceremony. More elaborate wedding receptions include entertainment from musicians, and the wedding is ended with a speech by a guest of higher social standing. In urban areas, wedding receptions tend to be held at hotels. In rural areas, wedding pavilions are temporarily erected to host the festivities. Gift-giving is an important element of Bamar weddings.

A traditional Bamar wedding ceremony is divided into seven chapters, namely:
Introduction or Paṇāma
 Invoking the Buddha
Gadaw of the Five Infinite Venerables
 Principal Consecration Rites
 Veneration of the Devas
 Admonishments
 Closing

Throughout the ceremony, the bride and groom sit on cushions next to each other. At the beginning of the wedding, the Brahmin blows a conch shell to commence the ceremony. The couple pays obeisance to the Buddha, spirits and parents, holding a bouquet of eugenia sprigs and flowers chosen according to the birthdays of the couple. The master of ceremony joins the palms of the couple, wraps them in white cloth, and dips the joined palms in a silver or gold bowl. After chanting a few Sanskrit mantras, the brahmin takes the couple's joined palms out of the bowl and blows the conch shell to end the ceremony. 

The wedding processional at the beginning of the wedding ceremony is accompanied by a  song called "Aura of Immeasurable Auspiciousness", which is drawn from Mahāgīta, the corpus of classical Burmese songs, and sung to the tune of a Burmese harp. The aforementioned song is analogous to the "Bridal Chorus" used in Western weddings. The style of Mahāgīta songs has also been adapted in more modern compositions, such as "Auspicious Song" composed by Twante Thein Tan, and "" by Waing Lamin Aung, both of which are commonly played at traditional Burmese weddings.

There are ten commonly observed Bamar wedding rites:

  – the groom's family visits the bride's family bearing wedding gifts, including a new longyi. The bride remains in her bedroom during the exchange of gifts, while the groom remains at his home. Afterwards, the groom's longyi or shawl is hung on a clothesline in another room to serve as the newlywed's new room, signifying the marriage.
  – the couple eat a morsel of cooked rice or snack from the same dish. 
 The couple exchanges wedding rings. 
 The groom visits the home of the bride's parents with a new set of longyi. The bride's family then bathes the groom and helps him change into the new set of clothes.
 A master of ceremony joins the right hands of the couple in front of the invitees to solemnize the marriage. 
  – the couple lower their heads as a gold or silver alloy necklace chain (4 cubits in length) and flower garlands are jointly hung over them.
  – a white shawl called , about 6 cubits long and 2 cubits wide, which is worn by the bride, is wrapped around the couple.
  – the couple place floral garlands over each other.
 The couple place their right hands, joined at the palm, into glass or silver bowls filled halfway with water and sprigs of Eugenia and blades of Saccharum grass, signifying the establishment of a long lasting marriage. Their hands are wrapped with white cloth, over which perfumed water from a conch or ceremonial vessel, is poured.
 The master of ceremony consecrates the wedded couple by dipping springs of Eugenia leaves into a gold or silver bowl and sprinkling the couple's foreheads with perfumed water.

Mon traditions 
The Mon people have a number of unique wedding traditions. The groom's family traditionally bears the wedding costs. The wedding itself is preceded by an engagement ceremony, in which five elders from the bride's family host five sets of parents from the groom's family to negotiate the financial terms of the marriage, including a dowry. The parties also negotiate the details of the wedding ceremony, including the food to be served and the date. The Mon exclusively wed during the Burmese months of Tazaungmon and Tabaung. After the wedding details are finalized, young virgins are dispatched to invite wedding attendees in nearby areas, bearing wedding cards and gifts of betel nut or lahpet (pickled tea leaves). 

In the lead-up to the wedding, the bride's family home, which serves as the ceremonial venue, is decorated. On the eve of the wedding, three virgins send gifts of pumpkin, coconut, papaya and khanom chin (vermicelli) to the bride's home, and the bride reciprocates the gifts with cigarettes. On the wedding day, the groom's family leads a procession to the bride's family home. The groom's eldest sister bears a gift basket containing a coconut sapling, areca palm, area nuts, betel leaves, pickled tea leaves, and household items including pepper, onion, rice, oil, and salt, while the youngest daughters carry lacquerware to the venue. Both the bride and groom are splashed with water using Eugenia leaves. The wedding ceremony continues with an exchange of gifts. Following the ceremony, the newlywed couple spend seven days in each other's family homes.

Rakhine traditions 
The Rakhine people practice a wedding ceremony called . A wedding table is set for the ceremony, sprinkled with paddy seeds and silver coins symbolizing prosperity and fertility. A platter of steamed sticky rice, signifying the couple's unity, is placed on the table. Atop the sticky rice are a pair of cooked prawns, fried whole fish, boiled duck eggs and sweet potatoes. The couple then don ceremonial wedding headdresses. Holy thread is then encircled and tied around the wedding table nine times. The couple partake in offering morsels of food to their parents. Then, the bride and groom take off their headdresses. The groom places his headdress on the bride's head, solemnizing the wedding.

Chin traditions 
The Chin people have a wide-ranging number of wedding traditions. The engagement is initiated by the groom's parents, who gift a bottle of alcohol to the bride's family in a rite called . After negotiating the wedding details, a  ceremony is held to take the bride from her family home. The families haggle and exchange cash, and the bride's family equips their daughter with a basket, blanket, mattock, axe, and bottle (or in modern times, money and jewels). The introduction of Christianity has displaced some traditional Chin rites. 

Among the Asho Chin, shamans called  officiate and organize traditional wedding ceremonies. In a significant wedding rite, a pig is slaughtered at dawn and its liver is extracted for examination. The  examines the liver to read the couple's future as a married couple.

References 

Burmese culture
Myanmar